The Trent Wind Farm, also known as the Trent Mesa Wind Project, is a 150 megawatt wind power station located between Abilene and Sweetwater in West Texas. The wind farm consists of 100 GE wind turbines each rated at 1.5 megawatts. American Electric Power owns the Trent Wind Farm and TXU Energy purchases the electricity produced under a long-term agreement.

The Trent Wind Farm began commercial operation in 2001, when it was the fourth largest wind farm operating in the United States.

See also

Wind power in the United States
Wind power in Texas

References

External links
Texas Wind Energy Projects

Energy infrastructure completed in 2001
Wind farms in Texas
Buildings and structures in Nolan County, Texas
American Electric Power